Jake Davis may refer to:

 Topiary (hacktivist) (Jake Leslie Davis, born 1992), British hacktivist
 Jake Davis (soccer) (born 2002), American soccer player
 Jake "Shake" Davis (died 1922), African-American man lynched in Miller County, Georgia, USA, see Lynching of Jake Davis

See also
 Jacob Davis (disambiguation)